Ainpur is a village in Kachua Upazila of Chandpur District in the Chittagong Division of eastern Bangladesh.

References

Villages in Chandpur District
Villages in Chittagong Division